David Niepsuj (born 16 August 1995) is a Polish professional footballer who plays as a right-back for Chojniczanka Chojnice.

Career statistics

References

External links

1995 births
Living people
Sportspeople from Wuppertal
Polish footballers
Association football defenders
Poland youth international footballers
Poland under-21 international footballers
Ekstraklasa players
II liga players
Wuppertaler SV players
VfL Bochum II players
VfL Bochum players
Pogoń Szczecin players
Wisła Kraków players
Podbeskidzie Bielsko-Biała players
Chojniczanka Chojnice players
Footballers from North Rhine-Westphalia